Valerio Cardamone (born 7 February 1999) is an Italian professional footballer who plays as a left-back.

Club career

Youth career 
Born in Taranto, Valerio Cardamone began his football career with the club of his native city, Taranto. At the age of 16, he joined Martina Franca where he became finalist of the Allievi Nazionali Lega Pro (under-17). Next year he played in the Primavera 1 (under-18) division with Torino, before signing at Carpi for a year on loan.

Serie D 
He started his senior career with two years in Serie D. First season at Legnago in 2017–18, and second season at Francavilla in 2018–19.

Bisceglie 
On 5 August 2019, Cardamone signed his first professional contract with Bisceglie. On 25 August 2019, he made his debut in the Serie C group C championship against Rende and won the game 1–0. He spent the entire year in the club.

Foggia 
On 9 December 2020, Cardamone signed a contract with Foggia. On 17 January 2021, he started with his new team in the Serie C group C against Catania and lost 2-1.

International career 
At the age of 16, Cardamone played for Italy under-17 team. Then, he was called by the coach of the national under-18 team for the Dossena Trophy who started on 11 June 2018 and was reserved for the 1999 and 2000 youths. He played for the Lega Pro Representative italy national team during the 2015–16 season, and for the Serie D Representative italy national team during the 2017–18 season.

References

External links 
 

Living people
1999 births
Sportspeople from Taranto
Footballers from Apulia
Italian footballers
Association football fullbacks
Italy youth international footballers
F.C. Legnago Salus players
A.S.D. Francavilla players
A.S. Bisceglie Calcio 1913 players
Calcio Foggia 1920 players
Serie C players
Serie D players